The 1999–2000 season was Sporting Clube de Portugal's 94th season in existence and the club's 66th consecutive season in the top flight of Portuguese football. In addition to the domestic league, Sporting CP will participate in this season's editions of the Taça de Portugal and UEFA Cup. The season covers the period from 1 July 1999 to 30 June 2000.

Season summary
Giuseppe Materazzi was signed as manager, but was sacked after only a few months, following a shock 3-0 defeat to Viking in the UEFA Cup. He was replaced by Augusto Inácio, who was unable to reverse Sporting's fortunes on the continent but still guided them to the title and the domestic cup final.

First team squad

Transfers

In
 Peter Schmeichel - Manchester United, free
 Mbo Mpenza - Standard Liège, January
 César Prates - Real Madrid B, January, loan

Competitions

Overall record

Primeira Liga

League table

Results by round

Taça de Portugal

UEFA Cup

First round

References 

Sporting CP seasons
Sporting Clube de Portugal
Portuguese football championship-winning seasons